Caloptilia leucolitha is a moth of the family Gracillariidae. It is known from the Northern Territory of Australia, India, Bali, Java and Sri Lanka.

The larvae feed on Litsea chinensis and Litsea glutinosa. They probably mine the leaves of their host plant.

References

leucolitha
Moths of Asia
Moths of Australia
Moths described in 1912